This is an incomplete list of significant art dealers:

 Guillam Forchondt the Elder (1608–1678): A 17th century Flemish Baroque painter and art dealer based in Antwerp.  He established an important art dealing business with international connections in Europe maintained by his extended family. He originally trained as a painter and cabinet maker but built a reputation through his international art business.  His children became art dealers who settled in various cities in Europe such as Venice, Paris, Vienna, Prague, Linz, Passau and Cadiz where they supplied an elite clientele with a variety of art objects.  When in the 1670s Flanders suffered a severe economic downturn due mostly to an invasion by the French, Guillam Forchondt and his brother Melchior the Younger became art entrepreneurs by hiring lesser painters to create group projects such as large commissioned copies of famous works or large decorative objects. At one point, the Brothers Forchondt had 60 painters in service for export to France, Austria, Spain and Portugal.

 Matthijs Musson (Antwerp, 1598–3 November 1678): A painter and art dealer based in Antwerp, who helped popularize artists of the 17th century Antwerp school by marketing them throughout Europe. Many of his correspondences have been published and studies of his business relationships with other dealers across Europe have established ideas about the art trade and its economics.

 Larry Gagosian (born 1945): Head of the multimillion-dollar Gagosian Gallery group.

 Arne Glimcher (born 1938): Glimcher is the founder of The Pace Gallery and is widely known as one of the art world's most powerful dealers. The Pace Gallery represents contemporary artists including Chuck Close, Tara Donovan, David Hockney, Maya Lin and Kiki Smith.  It also represents the estates of several artists, including Pablo Picasso, Agnes Martin, Ad Reinhardt, and Alexander Calder.  During his career he has worked closely with important artists including Jean Dubuffet, Robert Rauschenberg, Louise Nevelson, and Lucas Samaras.  In 2007, Glimcher received the Distinguished Alumni Award from the Massachusetts College of Art and Design.

 Edith Halpert (1900–1970): Halpert was born in 1900 in Odessa, arrived in the U.S. as a penniless Russian Jewish immigrant and grew to become a pioneering New York City art dealer, transforming the landscape of Modern art. Over her forty-year career from 1926 through the 1960s, Halpert brought recognition and market success to many avant-garde American artists. Her establishment The Downtown Gallery, one of the first in Greenwich Village, introduced and showcased many modern art luminaries. Halpert died at age 70 a multimillionaire, with Sotheby's crediting her with having put modernist painting auctions on the map. Its posthumous sale of her collection went for million in 1973.

 Klaus Perls: Perls (1912–2008) was born and raised in Berlin. He studied art history in Munich, but was forced to finish his education in Basel, Switzerland, as the Nazis were no longer allowing degrees for Jews. He ran Perls Galleries for over 60 years. His gallery dealt with contemporary American artists, modern works from the School of Paris and Mexican and South American art. Perls also developed an interest in art from Benin and built a sizable collection. He was not only an art dealer, but also a donor as he contributed many significant works of art to the Metropolitan Museum of Art. He died June 2, 2008, in Mount Kisco, N.Y. at age 96.

 Martha Hopkins Struever: Struever was born in 1931 in Milan, Indiana. She attended the Tobé-Coburn School For Fashion Careers in New York City, after obtaining her Bachelor of Science degree from Purdue University in Lafayette, Indiana in 1953. She began collecting and dealing in American Indian art in 1971, and is regarded as a leading scholar on historic and contemporary Pueblo Indian pottery and Pueblo and Navajo Indian jewelry. She has authored books on Charles Loloma, the foremost American Indian jeweler, and Dextra Quotskuyva, the pre-eminent contemporary Hopi potter, as well as exhibition catalogues on Hopi potter Iris Nampeyo and other Hopi art, and has guest curated museum shows in several cities.

 Jacques Seligmann: German-born Seligmann (1858–1923) moved to Paris in 1874 where he set up an antiquarian business in 1880. Benefiting from the interest of clients such as Edmond de Rothschild, he moved to the Place Vendôme in 1900 and in 1904 opened an office in New York. In 1909, he acquired the Hôtel de Monaco in Paris where he was able to impress his more important clients such as the Russian Stroganoff family and the high-flying British politician Sir Philip Sassoon. In New York, he developed interest in European art attracting collectors such as Benjamin Altman, William Randolph Hearst and J. P. Morgan. On his death, his son Germain Seligman continued to run Jacques Seligmann & Company.

 John Weber (1932–2008): Weber was born in 1932 in Los Angeles. He was a radio corpsman in the Navy during the Korean War before receiving a bachelor's degree from Antioch College in Yellow Springs, Ohio in 1958. As a contemporary art dealer, Weber was ahead of his time as he was one of the early promoters of Conceptual Art, Post-Minimalist sculpture and Italian Arte Povera. He was the director of several galleries throughout his career and helped organize shows that featured big names such as Robert Indiana, Richard Long and Andy Warhol. Weber died May 23, 2008, in Hudson, N.Y. at age 75.

Other notable art dealers

Hendrick van Uylenburgh, c. 1587–1661 and his son Gerrit van Uylenburgh, c. 1625–1679
Johannes de Renialme, c. 1600–1657
 Rembrandt, mid-17th century
 John Blackwood, 1696–1777
 Joseph Smith often known as Consul Smith, (ca 1682–1770), British consul at Venice, 1744–1760
 Colnaghi & Co, established c. 1760
 Paul Durand-Ruel, 1831–1922
 M Knoedler & Co, 1846–2011
 Duveen Brothers, (Joseph Joel Duveen 1843–1908, and Henry J. Duveen 1855–1918)
 Georges Petit, 1856–1920
 Theo van Gogh, 1857–1891
 Jacques Seligmann, 1858–1923
 Alfred Stieglitz, 1864–1946
 Charles Carstairs, 1865–1928
 Berthe Weill, 1865–1951 
 Ambroise Vollard, 1866–1939
 Joseph Duveen, 1st Baron Duveen, 1869–1939
 Paul Cassirer, 1871–1926
 Wilhelm Uhde, 1874–1947
 Léonce Rosenberg, 1879–1947
 Herwarth Walden, 1879–1941
 René Gimpel, 1881–1945
 Kurt Walter Bachstitz, 1882–1949
 Paul Rosenberg, 1881–1959
 Joseph Brummer, 1883–1947
 Goupil & Cie, 1850–1884
 Adolphe Goupil, 1827–1884 then Boussod, Valadon & Cie, 1884–1919
 Daniel-Henry Kahnweiler, 1884–1979
 Hugo Perls, 1886–1977
 Carroll Carstairs, 1888–1948
 Léopold Zborowski, 1889–1932
 Paul Guillaume, 1891–1934
 Georges Wildenstein, 1892–1963
 Sam Salz, 1894-1981
 Katia Granoff, 1895–1989
 Sidney Janis, 1896–1989
 Samuel M. Kootz, 1898–1982
 Pierre Matisse, 1900–1989
 Betty Parsons, 1900–1982
 René Drouin, 1905–1979
 Leo Castelli, 1907–1999
 Tibor de Nagy, 1908–1993
 Ileana Sonnabend, 1914–2007
 Heinz Berggruen 1914–2007
 Daniel Wildenstein, 1917–2001
 Jock Truman 1920–2011
 André Emmerich, 1924–2007
 Gregg Juarez, 1925–2018
 Ivan Karp, 1926–2012
 Richard Bellamy 1927–1998
 Jan Krugier, 1928–2008
 Virginia Dwan, 1931-
 Allan Barry Stone, 1932-2006      
 John Gibson, 1933–2019 
 Phyllis Kind, 1933–2018
 Gui Rochat, 1933-
 Nicholas Wilder, 1937–1989
 Paula Cooper, 1938– 
 Giuseppe Eskenazi, 1939-
 David Whitney, 1939–2005
 Robert Miller, 1939–2011
 Klaus Kertess, 1940–2016
 Anthony d'Offay, 1940–
 Bruno Bischofberger, 1940–
 Charles Cowles, 1941–
 Karsten Greve, 1946-
 Ann Freedman, c. 1949-
 Mary Boone, 1951–
 Jack Tilton, 1951–2017
 Serge Sorokko, 1954–
 Paul Kasmin, 1960-2020
 Ruth-Ann Thorn, 1965-
 David De Buck, 1979-

References

Dealers